"Knowing Me, Knowing You" is a song recorded by Swedish pop group ABBA, released in February 1977 as the third single from the group's fourth album, Arrival (1976). It was written by Benny Andersson, Björn Ulvaeus and Stig Anderson, with Anni-Frid Lyngstad singing the lead vocals. During recording sessions, it had the working titles of "Ring It In" and "Number 1, Number 1".

Background
"Knowing Me, Knowing You" was recorded in 1976 at the Metronome studio in Stockholm and was released as a single in February 1977, becoming one of the group's more successful hits. The B-side was "Happy Hawaii", an arrangement of another ABBA song, "Why Did It Have to Be Me?", but with a different lead vocalist and lyrics. "Knowing Me, Knowing You" was one of the early ABBA songs to deal with the break-up of a relationship. It predates the divorces of the ABBA members as well as further break-up songs to come: "The Winner Takes It All", "One of Us" and "When All Is Said and Done". Group member Benny Andersson named "Knowing Me, Knowing You" as one of ABBA's best recordings in a 2004 interview, along with "Dancing Queen", "The Winner Takes It All" and "When I Kissed the Teacher". "Conociéndome, Conociéndote" is the Spanish-language version of the song. It was included in the compilation Oro: Grandes Éxitos released in 1993 and Gracias Por La Música released in 1980.

Reception
"Knowing Me, Knowing You" proved to be one of ABBA's more successful singles, hitting #1 in West Germany (ABBA's sixth consecutive chart-topper there) and the United Kingdom, Ireland, Mexico and South Africa, and reaching the top 3 in Austria, Belgium, the Netherlands and Switzerland. It was a top 10 hit in Australia, Canada, France, New Zealand and Norway. In the United States, it became ABBA's sixth top 20 single, peaking at #14 on the Hot 100 and reaching #7 on Billboard's AC chart.

In the UK, "Knowing Me, Knowing You" was one of the biggest singles of 1977. It also began a second run of three consecutive #1 singles for ABBA (followed by "The Name of the Game" and "Take a Chance on Me"), the group having had three consecutive #1 hit singles in 1976. As of September 2021, it is the group's third-biggest song in the country with 1.02 million chart sales, made up of pure sales and streams.

By September 1979 in West Germany "Knowing Me, Knowing You" had sold over 300,000 copies.

Billboard reviewed the song and described it as a "melodically energetic but sad worded ditty about a romantic breakup."  Cash Box called it "a softly rocking record that combines memorable pop hooks in their distinctive reverb-soaked ambiance" and said that it has "a sound agreeable to just about any top 40 station." Record World said that "Its chorus is a mighty hook, capping another superb melody."

"Knowing Me, Knowing You" continues to be regarded as one of ABBA's finest songs. In 2017, Billboard ranked the song number four on their list of the 15 greatest ABBA songs, and in 2021, Rolling Stone ranked the song number two on their list of the 25 greatest ABBA songs.

Music video
The music video for "Knowing Me, Knowing You" depicts the band against various colored backdrops singing while facing each other, turning away as a new line is sung. At the end of the video, the band's female members are seen walking away through thick snow. The video was directed by future Academy Award nominee Lasse Hallström and is a landmark in his career alongside most other videos of the band which were directed by him.

Track listing

Personnel
 Anni-Frid Lyngstad – lead vocals
 Agnetha Fältskog – backing vocals
 Björn Ulvaeus – guitar, backing vocals
 Benny Andersson – keyboards, synthesizer
 Rutger Gunnarsson – bass, string arrangements

Charts

Weekly charts

Year-end charts

Sales and certifications

Cover versions
 A cover recorded in 1977 by the Top of the Poppers appears on the 2002 compilation album Knowing Me, Knowing You.
The Paraguayan singer Perla recorded a Spanish version, Conociendonos Mas for the 1977 album Relaciones Internacionales.
Czech singer Věra Špinarová recorded a Czech version, Slunečné pobřeží (meaning Sunny Beach in Bulgaria), in 1977.
The French conductor Franck Pourcel recorded an instrumental version for his 1978 album Pourcel meets Abba.
British singer Cilla Black recorded a cover for her 1980 album Especially for You.
Swedish pop group A-Teens included the song as a bonus track on the Japanese edition of their debut album The ABBA Generation.
Danny Wilson recorded a live version of the song, which was released on their bonus album Three-In-A-Bed Romp in 1991.  The instrumental solo is played on an accordion.
Danish indie/electronica band How Do I included a cover of the song on their 1991 album Submarine
Danish singer Sanne Salomonsen recorded her cover of the song for the 1992 Swedish tribute album ABBA – The Tribute, released on the Polar Music label.
American power pop band Wondermints included a cover of the song on their 1996 album Wonderful World of the Wondermints.
Marshall Crenshaw released a live version on his 1994 album "Live …My Truck Is My Home".
Evan Dando, former lead singer of The Lemonheads, recorded an acoustic version of the song on the album ABBA: A Tribute – The 25th Anniversary Celebration released in 1999.
Right Said Fred covered the song on the German album ABBA Mania, which was a tie-in to a TV special in Germany.
Swedish musician Nils Landgren included a rendition of the song on his 2004 tribute album Funky ABBA.
A version by Swedish heavy metal band Tad Morose was included on the ABBA tribute compilation ABBAMetal (also released as A Tribute to ABBA).
The Royal Philharmonic Orchestra recorded an instrumental version of the song.
Richard Clayderman played an instrumental version on his album The ABBA Collection.
In 2016, former The Mission-guitarist Mark Thwaite released a cover of the song, featuring Ville Valo, lead singer of HIM.
Australian singer Angie McMahon covered the song on triple j's Like a Version program in 2019.
Swiss singer Richard Gyver released an electro-pop cover of the song in October 2020 together with a music video very much inspired by Lasse Hallström's original work for the ABBA promotional footage; replicas of the ABBA kimono outfits are worn by mannequins in the video.
South African Pop/R&B girlband covered the song on their 3rd Base album in 2008.

Live cover performances and appearances in other media
Brief clips from the original ABBA recording features in the film ABBA: The Movie (1977) when Ashley is stuck in a traffic jam; it is presumably coming from the radio of another car. 
Live versions have been performed by various artists, including Elvis Costello, Joe Jackson, Norwegian singer/actress Anneli Drecker, Swedish band Eskobar, Canadian singer Ron Sexsmith and American singer Marshall Crenshaw.
The song is performed in the musical Mamma Mia! by the character of Sam. In the context of the musical, the song is used as Sam's description of his failed marriage.
It is featured in the film adaptation's sequel, performed by younger versions of Sam (Jeremy Irvine) and Donna (Lily James), as well as the present-day Sam (Pierce Brosnan) and Sophie (Amanda Seyfried).
The song is the theme of the Steve Coogan 1990's comic vehicle Knowing Me, Knowing You... with Alan Partridge.

References

External links
  https://www.songtexte.com/songtext/abba/happy-hawaii-63d63eeb.html

1970s ballads
1976 songs
1977 singles
ABBA songs
European Hot 100 Singles number-one singles
Irish Singles Chart number-one singles
Music videos directed by Lasse Hallström
Number-one singles in Germany
Number-one singles in South Africa
Polar Music singles
Pop ballads
Songs written by Benny Andersson and Björn Ulvaeus
Songs written by Stig Anderson
UK Singles Chart number-one singles